Zachary Kanin is an American writer, producer, and cartoonist. He is a former SNL staff writer and the co-creator, producer, and writer of Detroiters and I Think You Should Leave with Tim Robinson.

Early life and education 
Kanin was born in Washington, D.C. to Dennis R. Kanin and Carol Kanin, and was raised in Newton, Massachusetts. His maternal grandfather is former Rhode Island governor Frank Licht. Kanin began drawing as early as preschool.

He attended Harvard University and received his degree in English. He joined The Harvard Lampoon in 2002 and later became president.

Career 
Kanin worked as an assistant to The New Yorker's cartoons editor, Robert Mankoff for two years after college. Eventually, Kanin began to submit his own work for publication. He has published approximately 300 cartoons in The New Yorker as of 2014. The style of his cartoons was described by Richard Gehr of The Comics Journal as "a slightly surreal place where things have gone sometimes seriously awry."

Kanin was hired to the writing staff of SNL in 2011 and left in 2016. While working there he met fellow writer Tim Robinson and the two became writing partners. They collaborated to create Detroiters (2017–2018) and I Think You Should Leave with Tim Robinson (2019– ). He was also a writer for Documentary Now!, The Characters, and Michael Bolton's Big, Sexy Valentine's Day Special.

Personal life 
Kanin is married.

Awards and nominations

References

External links 
 
Zach Kanin at The New Yorker

Year of birth missing (living people)
Living people
American television writers
American cartoonists
American producers
Writers Guild of America Award winners
Screenwriters from Massachusetts
Harvard University alumni
The New Yorker cartoonists
Writers from Newton, Massachusetts
American sketch comedians